Sir David Basil Williams (born 18 June 1964) is a British High Court judge.

Early life and education 
He was born in Bedford and educated at Cedars Upper School in Leighton Buzzard. He completed an LLB at the University of Leicester and the BVC at the Inns of Court School of Law.

Career 
From 1986 to 1989, he was an executive officer at the Legal Aid Board. In 1990, he was called to the bar at the Inner Temple. He practised from 3 Dr Johnson's Buildings from 1990 to 2000 and 4 Paper Buildings from 2000 to 2017 and specialised in family law. He took silk in 2013 and served as a recorder from 2016 to 2017. He has been a contributing editor of Butterworths Family Law Service since 2012, and editor of Rayden and Jackson since 2015.

High Court appointment 
On 2 October 2017, he was appointed a judge of the High Court and assigned to the Family Division. He took the customary knighthood in the same year.

Personal life and politics 
In 2000, he married Siobhan Hoy, with whom he has two sons and a daughter. A member of the Labour Party since 1987, he stood as the Labour candidate for Wycombe constituency in 2015, coming second to Steve Baker.

References 

Living people
1964 births
21st-century English judges
Knights Bachelor
Alumni of the University of Leicester
People from Bedford
Members of the Inner Temple
Family Division judges
Labour Party (UK) parliamentary candidates
English King's Counsel
21st-century King's Counsel